Semlin may refer to:

An alternative German name for Zemun, a town in Serbia
Semlin concentration camp, an alternative name for Sajmište concentration camp
Semlin, Poland
Charles Augustus Semlin (1836-1927), 12th Premier of the Canadian province of British Columbia 1898-1900
Sod building made by Russian Mennonite immigrants in North America in the 1870s as temporary housing and some used later as a root cellar.